Steve Ramsey is a British guitarist who began his career with the heavy metal band Satan in the early 1980s, releasing a single and an album, a second album under the band name Blind Fury, an EP and another album after changing the band name back to Satan and two more albums after renaming the band name once again, to Pariah.

After the split of Pariah in 1990, he teamed up with singer Martin Walkyier (ex-Sabbat) to form a heavy metal band with strong folk influences, called Skyclad.

Ramsey has also participated in other band projects, for example as album guest and live guitarist for Forgodsake.

Ramsey is influenced by classic hard rock acts like Thin Lizzy, Uriah Heep, etc. While initially starting as a thrash metal band with folk influences, these "classic" roots became more and more visible in Skyclad's music over the years.

Discography

Satan

EPs/demos/live releases 
The First Demo (Demo), 1981
Into the Fire (Demo), 1982
Kiss of Death (Single), 1982
Dirt Demo '86 (Demo), 1986
Into the Future (EP), 1987
Blitzkrieg in Holland (Live), 2000
Live in the Act (Live), 2004

Studio albums 
Court in the Act, 1983
Suspended Sentence, 1987
Life Sentence, 2013
Atom by Atom, 2015
Cruel Magic, 2018

Blind Fury 
Demo '84 (Demo), 1984

Studio albums 
Out of Reach, 1985

Pariah

Studio albums 
Pariah The Kindred, 1988
Pariah Blaze of Obscurity, 1989
Pariah Unity, 1998

Skyclad 

Lemming Project / Skyclad (Split), 1991
Tracks from the Wilderness (EP), 1992
Thinking Allowed? (EP), 1993
Old Rope (Compilation), 1997
Outrageous Fourtunes (EP), 1998
Classix Shape (EP), 1999
Poetic Wisdom (Compilation), 2001
Another Fine Mess (Live), 2001
Swords of a Thousand Men (Single), 2001
Live at the Dynamo (Live), 2002
History Lessens (Compilation), 2002
Jig-a-Jig (EP) 2006

Studio albums 
The Wayward Sons of Mother Earth, 1991
A Burnt Offering for the Bone Idol, 1992
Jonah's Ark, 1993
Prince of the Poverty Line, 1994
The Silent Whales of Lunar Sea, 1995
Irrational Anthems, 1996
Oui Avant-Garde a Chance, 1996
The Answer Machine?, 1997
Vintage Whine, 1999
Folkémon, 2000
No Daylights Nor Heeltaps (Re-recording album), 2002
A Semblance of Normality , 2004
In the... All Together, 2009

References

External links 

 Skyclad MySpace site
 Satan Myspace site

Year of birth missing (living people)
Living people
British heavy metal guitarists
British male guitarists